Jeannette Ryder (born in Wisconsin, USA, 1866, died in Cuba, 1931) was an American philanthropist and animals rights activist who lived in Cuba at the beginning of the 20th century. She founded the humanitarian organization Society for the Protection of Children, Animals and Plants, also known as the Bando de Piedad in 1906.

Biography 
Upon her death in 1931, she was buried in the Colón Cemetery in Havana. Her grave is known as the "loyalty grave" because her dog Rinti lay at the foot of the grave and refused the food and water offered by the caretakers of the cemetery until she died.

The animal was buried next to its owner and is one of the two animals officially buried in the Colón cemetery. A recumbent sculpture (the only one of its kind in the necropolis) representing Rinti who rests at the foot of the tomb was erected in 1945. Since then this tomb has been known as "of loyalty" or "the tomb of the little dog".

Recognitions 
In July 1957, to commemorate the 50th anniversary of the founding of the Bando de Piedad, the Ministry of Communications of the Republic of Cuba issued two stamps of 4 and 12 cents respectively honoring Ryder and her legacy.

References 

1866 births
1931 deaths
Activists from Wisconsin
American animal rights activists
American emigrants to Cuba
Burials in Cuba